"Living in the Promiseland" is a song written by David Lynn Jones, and recorded by American country music artist Willie Nelson.  It was released in February 1986 as the first single from the album The Promiseland.  The song was Nelson's twelfth number one single on the country chart as a solo artist, spending one week at number one and twenty weeks on the chart.

In 1988, Jones recorded his own version of the song and included it as the b-side to his single "High Ridin' Heroes", a duet with Waylon Jennings which reached number 14 on the same chart.

It was most recently recorded by Laura Black-Wines under the record label Subterra Records, and released in August 2017.

Chart performance

References

1986 singles
Willie Nelson songs
Columbia Records singles
American patriotic songs
David Lynn Jones songs
1986 songs